WTOP-FM (103.5 FM) – branded WTOP Radio and WTOP News – is a commercial all-news radio station licensed to serve Washington, D.C. Owned by Hubbard Broadcasting, the station serves the Washington metropolitan area, extending its reach through two repeater stations: WTLP (103.9 FM) in Braddock Heights, Maryland, and WWWT-FM (107.7) in Manassas, Virginia. The WTOP-FM studios, referred to on-air as the "WTOP Glass-Enclosed Nerve Center", are located in the Washington D.C. neighborhood of Friendship Heights, while the station transmitter is located on the American University campus. Besides a standard analog transmission, WTOP-FM broadcasts over three HD Radio channels, and is available online.

Historically, the 103.5 FM facility is perhaps best known as WGMS-FM, which operated with a commercial fine arts and classical music format from 1948 until 2006. WTOP-FM is considered the successor station to WTOP (1500 AM), now WFED, a station founded in Brooklyn, New York City in 1926 which moved to Washington the following year. WTOP and WTOP-FM have served as Washington's CBS affiliate for all but two years since first joining the network in 1929.

History

1920s: Born in Brooklyn
WTOP's origins trace back to Brooklyn, New York, as station WTRC (operated by the Twentieth [District] Republican Club), going to air September 25, 1926, on 1250 kilocycles with a power of 50 watts. On August 2, 1927, WTRC migrated to Mount Vernon Hills, Virginia; a suburb of Washington.

On January 10, 1929, the call sign was changed to WJSV, reflecting the initials of owner James S. Vance, who was publisher of "The Fellowship Forum" and a KKK Grand Wizard in Virginia. Realizing the expense of running a 10,000-watt radio station, Vance quickly worked out a deal with the nascent Columbia Broadcasting System to become the new network's Washington affiliate, beginning a relationship that would last for almost 90 years. As part of the deal, CBS took over all of WJSV's programming and engineering costs, with an option to renew or purchase the station after five years.

1930s: CBS O&O
In June 1932, CBS exercised its option to purchase WJSV outright, and moved its operations to Alexandria, Virginia. After three months off the air, WJSV resumed broadcasting on October 20, 1932. Arthur Godfrey, who later hosted a variety program on CBS Radio and CBS Television, hosted a program on WJSV called The Sundial on which he honed a laid-back, conversational style that was unusual on radio at the time.

On September 21, 1939, WJSV recorded its entire broadcast day for posterity. The WJSV broadcast day recordings still exist and copies can be found at the Internet Archive and various old time radio websites.

WJSV was also a key training ground for pioneering newsman Bob Trout in the 1930s before he became a network correspondent. (One of his broadcasting mentors was Wells (Ted) Church, who later became a CBS News executive.) Longtime Los Angeles-area TV newscaster George Putnam worked at WJSV in 1938 and continued to work in radio for seven decades until his death in 2008. Frank Blair, who later became an NBC News correspondent and later was a long time news anchor on the Today show during the 1960s and early 1970s, worked at WJSV.   John Daly, longtime host of game show "What's My Line?" and 1950's anchor on ABC-TV news, also got his start on WJSV.

1940s
In 1940, WJSV's operating power was increased to 50,000 watts from a new transmitter site in Wheaton, Maryland. On March 29, 1941, with the implementation of NARBA, WJSV moved its broadcast frequency from 1460 to 1500 kHz.

On March 16, 1943, after paying the Tiffin, Ohio police department $60,000 for the rights to the call letters WTOP, the calls were changed to the current WTOP because its new frequency was now at the "top" of the mediumwave AM band.

CBS sold 55 percent majority control of WTOP to The Washington Post in February 1949; this deal was made so CBS could acquire full control of KQW in San Francisco. As part of the transaction, The Post divested WINX (1340 AM), but retained WINX-FM through a legal maneuver, which was renamed WTOP-FM. The Post took over the remainder of WTOP in December 1954.

1960s and 1970s: All-news
After its signature personality Arthur Godfrey left WTOP in 1948 to concentrate on his television and midday network radio shows, the station gradually faded in popularity as it faced competition from the Washington Star's WMAL with the morning team of Harden and Weaver, and NBC-owned WRC which featured future Today Show personality Willard Scott. In the 1960s, after a series of failed music formats, WTOP phased out its music programming for a combination of newscasts and phone-in talk shows.

The switch to all-news – at first only during the week – came in March 1969. Among those working for WTOP during this time were Sam Donaldson, later on ABC-TV; Jim Bohannon, who took Larry King's place on his all-night radio network talk show after King went to CNN; and including Ralph Begleiter and Jamie MacIntyre, both of whom went to CNN.

WTOP studios were apparently a critical link in Emergency Broadcast System activation scenarios during the Cold War era.

The Post sold WTOP to The Outlet Company in June 1978, in reaction to the FCC looking askance at common ownership of newspapers and broadcasting outlets in the same city, believing one company should not have too much control of local media. One month later, WTOP-TV was swapped with the Detroit News's WWJ-TV, and became WDVM-TV. The station is today WUSA-TV, owned by Tegna. The original FM frequency for WTOP-FM was 96.3 MHz, but that frequency was donated to Howard University. That station became WHUR in 1971, a commercially run radio station.

1990s–2020s: Move to FM
Outlet re-organized and sold WTOP to Chase Broadcasting in 1989, who in turn sold it to Evergreen Media (which eventually became Chancellor Broadcasting) in November 1992. In April 1997, Evergreen's newly acquired 94.3 MHz facility in Warrenton, Virginia, began simulcasting the WTOP signal for better coverage in the sprawling Northern Virginia suburbs. Shortly afterward, on October 10, 1997, Bonneville International Corporation purchased WTOP.

On April 1, 1998, 94.3 was swapped for a stronger signal at 107.7, also licensed to Warrenton. (The 94.3 facility is now K-Love station WLZV.) Then in December 2000, WTOP gained another simulcast in Frederick, Maryland, with WXTR at 820 kHz, establishing the "WTOP Radio Network", a name it used until 2006.

Over its first three decades, WTOP commonly broke the all-news format for sports – including, at various times, the Washington Capitals, Washington Bullets/Wizards, and Baltimore Orioles – and, in its early years, overnight and weekend talk shows. As listeners increasingly indicated a desire for uninterrupted news, this programming dwindled over the years; WTOP completed the transition to 24/7 news when it dropped the Orioles in 1999.

In 2005, the station began providing podcasts of selected broadcast programs, and in 2006, WTOP began broadcasting in digital "HD Radio", utilizing iBiquity Digital Corp.'s IBOC (in-band on-channel) technology.

On January 4, 2006, Bonneville International announced that WTOP would move to a new primary frequency of 103.5 FM, then held by classical station WGMS (which would move to 103.9 and 104.1 FM). WTOP's longtime facility at 1500 AM, as well as both FM translators (107.7 in Warrenton and low-powered 104.3 in Leesburg), would be reassigned to the new "Washington Post Radio" for a March 30, 2006 launch date. Fittingly, this new partnership also signaled the Post'''s return to the radio scene on the very same dial spot WTOP once held.  The station has been dominant in the 25-54 demographics since moving to FM.

The stations' respective call signs were changed as of January 11, 2006: the former WTOP pair became WTWP (The Washington Post) and WTOP's new primary stations assumed the WTOP calls. HD Radio digital subchannels of the 103.5 carrier originally had broadcast Bonneville International's "iChannel" music format, which features unsigned, independent rock bands on the HD2 channel, and the HD3 channel aired continuous traffic and weather updates.  Later iChannel was dropped for an LMA of the HD2 to a group that currently airs programming aimed at the South Asian community in the Washington area. Sometime in or before June 2013, that LMA was replaced with the predecessor to what is now Radio Sputnik. As of July 1, 2017, WTOP-HD2 began broadcasting the feed from WFED (1500 AM), after Radio Sputnik moved its Washington DC-area broadcasting to conventional (non-digital) frequency 105.5 MHz. Currently, WTOP-FM's HD3 channel is carrying a wide-ranging pop music channel called "The Gamut".

In 2006, WTOP dropped its long-standing association with The Weather Channel and began airing weather reports exclusively from WJLA-TV all day long. Previously, WTOP had used weather reports from WJLA chief meteorologist Doug Hill during morning and evening rush hours and The Weather Channel all other times.  Until 2015, the station used all WJLA meteorologists, not just Doug Hill. WJLA's "Live Super Doppler 7" has been featured in weather reports as necessary. In 2015, WTOP began airing weather reports and using meteorologists exclusively from WRC-TV all day long.

In 2007, the WTOP radio configuration was realigned once again. WTLP-FM (formerly WGYS) at 103.9 picked up the WTOP simulcast on April 6, 2007, after the adult hits "George 104" simulcast with WXGG (now WPRS-FM, since sold to Radio One) was broken up, and adopted the WTLP calls on July 5, 2007.

Also in 2007, WTOP began broadcasting on WJLA's "Weather Now" digital sub-channel, which is carried on cable systems well beyond WTOP's broadcast area, though this was ended in late July 2009.

In May 2007, WTOP sold the naming rights to its "Glass-Enclosed Nerve Center" (its nickname for its studio) to area business Ledo Pizza.  That sponsorship concluded at the end of 2007.  Other sponsorship continues, with sportscasts being "fed" by Ledo Pizza.

WTOP AM (which was now on 820 in Frederick) changed its calls to WTWT and switched to the Washington Post Radio simulcast on June 28, 2007. On September 20, 2007, the 1500/107.7/820 multicast changed format over to a general talk format as "Talk Radio 3WT" under the WWWT/WWWT-FM/WWWB call letters, which was cancelled on August 11, 2008. WWWT and WWWB took over the "Federal News Radio" format (and for the 1500 kHz facility, the WFED calls), while WWWT-FM went back to simulcasting WTOP-FM. The former WFED took over the WTOP callsign on the AM dial and became a simulcast of WTOP, with preemptions for sporting events. On June 13, 2009, the 1050 AM frequency changed to a separate news/talk format, operated by Air America Radio as WZAA. On January 26, 2010, following the shutdown of Air America Radio, WZAA returned to the WTOP simulcast. It took back the WTOP call letters on February 1, 2010.  WTOP AM left the simulcast on June 23, 2010, as Bonneville leased the station to United Media Group.  United Media changed the call letters to WBQH and flipped to Regional Mexican.

In March 2008, WTOP-FM completed a year-long, $2.5-million state-of-the-art renovation of its newsroom and studios, the first since 1989 when the station moved into the building it presently occupies in northwest Washington.

In 2008, WTOP-FM generated $51.75-million in revenue, the sixth-highest total for any radio station in the United States and the only station not based in New York City or Los Angeles to crack the top ten. In 2009, the station generated $51-million in revenue, good for second among all radio stations in the United States, trailing only KIIS-FM in Los Angeles. In 2010, WTOP generated $57.225-million in revenue, making it tops among radio station in the United States. In 2011 WTOP once again generated more revenue than any other station in the United States, this time with $64 million.

In 2010, WTOP-FM's coverage of the record Washington-area snowfalls in early February earned it record ratings as the only local media outlet on the air and covering the storm live all day and night. During the week of the storms, which dropped two feet of snow in the area, WTOP had a 16.9% share of the area's radio audience, far exceeding its typical weekly average of around 10%. Consumer research company Arbitron estimated a total of 1.49 million people tuned in at some point during the week, 39% of the total local radio audience of 3.8 million.

Bonneville announced the sale of WTOP-FM, WTLP, and WWWT-FM, as well as 14 other stations, to Hubbard Broadcasting on January 19, 2011.

In 2011, WTOP-FM brought their traffic reporting in-house, ending their relationship with Metro Networks. This meant that Lisa Baden, the longtime "voice of D.C.-area traffic" and a Metro Networks employee, was forced to leave the station in what WTOP's Vice President of News and Programming Jim Farley said was strictly a business decision. Farley said WTOP tried to bring Baden and other Metro Networks employees to WTOP, but they have clauses in their contracts prohibiting them from working for competitors for one year. Baden said she was "devastated".  Shortly after that, Baden joined rival radio station WMAL.

On January 1, 2018, WTOP-FM switched from CBS to ABC for its top-of-the-hour newscasts, pausing a relationship with CBS that, as noted above, dated to the late 1920s. WTOP-FM rejoined CBS exactly two years later.

Repeaters

Translators and HD Radio

The HD2 subchannels of WTOP-FM and WTLP relay the programming of WFED (1500 AM), while WWWT-FM's is leased by Metro Radio and airs a Bollywood music format branded "Intense FM". Metro uses the HD subchannel to feed their FM translator W275BO (102.9 FM, Reston, Virginia), which cannot originate programming of its own.

The HD3 subchannels of all three stations air a freeform music format branded as "The Gamut", which is also simulcast on WWFD (820 AM digital) and two analog translators.

Ratings
As of July 2009, WTOP is ranked #1 in the Arbitron ratings among radio stations in the Washington area.

As of November 25, 2014, WTOP is still #1 in Washington, DC according to Arbitron.

Programming
All-news radio accounts for all regular programming on WTOP-FM. Presented in an hourly "wheel", this includes CBS News on the Hour; Traffic and Weather on the 8s; and regularly scheduled sports and business updates twice every half-hour, respectively.

Among the recurring segments on WTOP-FM every week: To Your Health, devoted to health topics and related warnings; Sprawl & Crawl, devoted to road construction updates; Friday Freebies, presenting sales and deals from local stores and businesses; Garden Plot, hosted by Mike McGrath; and Data Doctor's Tech Tips, offers tech advice. WTOP also features two daily commentaries hosted by Chris Core and Clinton Yates.

Two contests air on WTOP: the weekly Mystery Newsmaker Contest, and the daily Winning Word.

Awards

2002 RTNDA Edward R. Murrow Award (National) for Best Large Market Radio News Website
2003 RTNDA Edward R. Murrow Award (National) for Best Large Market Radio News Website
2003 RTNDA Edward R. Murrow Award (National) for Best Radio Large Market Spot News Coverage - "Serial Sniper"
2006 RTNDA Edward R. Murrow Award (National) for Best Radio Large Market Feature Reporting - "Scary Clown"
2006 RTNDA Edward R. Murrow Award (National) for Best Radio Large Market Spot News Coverage - "Capital Chaos"
2008 RTNDA Edward R. Murrow Award (National) for Best Large Market Radio News Website
2009 RTNDA Edward R. Murrow Award (National) for Best Radio Large Market Feature Hard News - "Hidden Hunter"
2009 RTNDA Edward R. Murrow Award (National) for Best Radio Large Market Use of Sound - "Cathedral Bells"
2009 RTNDA Edward R. Murrow Award (National) for Best Radio Large Market Writing - "Core Values"
2009 RTNDA Edward R. Murrow Award (National) for Best Large Market Radio News Website
2009 RTNDA Edward R. Murrow Award (National) for Large Market Radio News Overall Excellence
2010 National Association of Broadcasters Marconi Award  for Major Market Station of the Year.

See also

WDCH-FM
1926 in radio

References

External links

 WJSV schedule for September 21, 1939
 Free mp3s of 19 hours of the broadcast day of WJSV for September 21, 1939
 Information on WJSV Broadcast Day
 WTOP-FM at TopHour''
 

Frederick County, Maryland
All-news radio stations in the United States
TOP-FM
TOP-FM
Hubbard Broadcasting
Radio stations established in 1948
1948 establishments in Washington, D.C.